Châtenay or Chatenay is the name or part of the name of several communes in France:

 Châtenay, in the Ain département
 Châtenay, in the Eure-et-Loir département
 Châtenay, in the Isère département
 Châtenay, in the Saône-et-Loire département
 Châtenay-en-France, in the Val-d'Oise département
 Châtenay-Malabry, in the Hauts-de-Seine département
 Châtenay-sur-Seine, in the Seine-et-Marne département
 Chatenay-Vaudin, in the Haute-Marne département
 Chatenay-Mâcheron, in the Haute-Marne département